Edward William Johnston (3 September 1891 – 3 October 1922) was an Australian rules footballer who played with Melbourne in the Victorian Football League (VFL). He was injured in the first match of the 1919 season, and never played a senior VFL match again.

Notes

External links 

 
Teddy Johnston on Demonwiki

1891 births
1922 deaths
Australian rules footballers from Victoria (Australia)
Melbourne Football Club players